Beaver Brook is a Canadian rural community in Albert County, New Brunswick.

History

Notable people

See also
List of communities in New Brunswick

References
 

Communities in Albert County, New Brunswick